Tiga Angelina was an Indian politician . She was a Member of Parliament, representing Bihar in the Rajya Sabha the upper house of India's Parliament as a member of the Jharkhand Party.

References

Rajya Sabha members from Bihar
Jharkhand Party politicians
Women in Bihar politics
1909 births
Year of death missing
Women members of the Rajya Sabha